Calosoma bulleri is a species of ground beetle in the subfamily of Carabinae. It was described by Beheim & Breuning in 1943.

References

bulleri
Beetles described in 1943